Darvish Khalak (also Romanized as Darvīsh Khalak; also known as Darvīsh Khīlak) is a village in Peyrajeh Rural District, in the Central District of Neka County, Mazandaran Province, Iran. At the 2006 census, its population was 89, in 27 families.

References 

Populated places in Neka County